Robert Peterson (born January 18, 1961) is an American animator, director, screenwriter, storyboard supervisor and voice actor who works at Pixar. He was hired at Pixar by Roger Gould in 1994 as an animator for commercials, before subsequently becoming an animator on Toy Story (1995). He was the co-director and co-writer for Up (2009), in which he also voiced the characters Dug and Alpha. His work as a writer on Up and Finding Nemo (2003) have earned him nominations for the Academy Award for Best Original Screenplay. He was also a co-writer on Cars 3 (2017) and won the Primetime Emmy Award for Outstanding Short Form Animated Program for his work on Forky Asks A Question (2020).

Career
Peterson has also voiced characters for various Pixar projects such as Geri in the short Geri's Game (1997), Roz in Monsters, Inc. (2001) and Monsters University (2013), Mr. Ray in Finding Nemo (2003) and Finding Dory (2016), and Dug and Alpha in Up. His most recent vocal work was Dug in the short-form series Dug Days. Peterson also voiced  Chick Hicks in Cars 3 since Chick's original voice actor Michael Keaton was unable to reprise the role due to scheduling conflicts with Spider-Man: Homecoming.

He conceived Pixar's The Good Dinosaur (2015) and directed the film until August 2013, when it was announced that he had been dismissed from the project due to story problems. Peterson remains at Pixar, where he is developing another project.

In August 2015, Peterson voiced a dog named Derby for an E:60 profile on ESPN that chronicled the Trenton Thunder's minor league baseball team's tradition of using bat dogs.

Filmography

Feature films

Short films

Television

Video games

Other credits

References

External links 

 
 

1961 births
Living people
American animators
American filmmakers
American male screenwriters
American male voice actors
Animation screenwriters
Filmmakers from Ohio
Annie Award winners
Pixar people
Primetime Emmy Award winners